The Alarm-class torpedo gunboat was the penultimate class of torpedo gunboat built for the Royal Navy.  The class was contemporary with the early torpedo boat destroyers, which were faster and thus better suited to pursuit of enemy torpedo boats.  By World War I the class had either been sold, converted to submarine depot ships or minesweepers, or reduced to harbour service.  Three of the class were lost during World War I while serving in the minesweeping role.

Design
The Alarm class was designed by Sir William White in 1889 as an enlarged version of his previous Sharpshooter class. They were engined with two sets of vertical triple-expansion steam engines, two locomotive boilers, and twin screws. They carried between 100 and 160 tons of coal and were manned by 91 sailors and officers.

Thornycroft Special - HMS Speedy
While officially classed with the Alarm class, the Speedy was actually a separate design. The Naval Defence Act of 1889 authorised the purchase of an Alarm-class torpedo gunboat built to a design by John I. Thornycroft & Company and built in their yard at Chiswick.  Speedy was a three-funnelled vessel (compared to the two-funnelled Admiralty design), but the key difference was the use of water-tube boilers instead of locomotive-type boilers; she produced at least  and could make .  The use of water-tube boilers was a key feature of the new torpedo boat destroyers that would make torpedo gunboats (including the Alarm class) obsolete.

Armament
At build the class was fitted with two QF /45-pounder guns, four 3-pounder guns and one Gardner machine gun. Five  torpedo tubes were fitted in the first five vessels, but this was changed to three 18-inch (450mm) torpedo tubes in the rest of the class.  They were arranged as a pair of revolving deck mounts, a pair of fixed deck mounts (deleted in the later vessels) and a single bow-mounted tube; three reloads were provided.

Ships

References

Bibliography

 
Ship classes of the Royal Navy
Torpedo gunboat classes
 A